The declension of Irish nouns, the definite article, and the adjectives is discussed on this page (for pronouns, see Irish morphology).

Nouns

Gender
Nouns in Irish are divided into two genders, masculine and feminine; the Old Irish neuter gender no longer exists. While gender should be learned when the specific noun is learned, there are some guidelines that can be followed:

Generally, nouns in singular form ending with broad consonants are masculine, while those ending in a slender consonant are feminine.

This leads to some unexpected gender assignments, such as  "boy scout" being feminine, and  "girl" masculine (the diminutive  suffix is always masculine irrespective of the noun it applies to).

Case
Irish has four cases: common (usually called the nominative, but it covers the role of the accusative as well), vocative, genitive, and the dative or prepositional case.

Nominative
The nominative is used in the following functions:
 Sentence subject
 "The cat is drinking."
 Sentence object
 "Seán broke the window."
 Predicate of the copula
 "He is an idiot."
 Object of the prepositions  "without",   "(up) to" and mar "like, as".
 "without the money"
 "(up) to the time"
 "like the hen"

Vocative
The vocative is used in direct address, and is always preceded by the particle , which triggers lenition (the vocative  particle is not pronounced before a vowel sound).  The first declension is the only declension in which the vocative is distinct from the nominative.
 "Where are you, son?"
 "Seán, come here!"

Genitive
The genitive indicates possession and material of composition:
 "the man's hat"
 "the woman's children"
 "the bishop's candelabras"
 "a ring of gold, a golden ring"
 "shoes of leather, leather shoes"

The object of a verbal noun also requires the genitive:
 "(the act of) spending money"

The object of a compound preposition is in the genitive. Formally, these prepositions are actually prepositional phrases.
 "behind the door" (lit. "on the back of the door")
 "one month long" (lit. "for the duration of one month")
 "for Ireland's sake"

Dative/Prepositional
In standard language, the dative is almost always identical to the nominative. Some dialects, however, have distinct standalone datives in the second and fifth declensions. "over the head" – cionn is the old dative of ceann ("head")).
 "at the father"
 "out of the house"
 "on the bread"
 "in an orange"
 "to hell"
 "with the money"
 "from Ireland"

Declension
There are five recognized declensions in Irish.  The makeup of the declensions depends on three factors:
 the gender of the noun
 the formation of the genitive singular
 relation of genitive singular to nominative plural

The following chart describes the characteristics of each declension class:

First
The first declension is made up of masculine nouns. The nominative singular ends in a broad consonant, which is made slender in the genitive singular. The most common formation of the plural has the opposite pattern:  the nominative ends in a slender consonant, the genitive in a broad consonant (these plurals are known as weak plurals in comparison with strong plurals which maintain identical endings for all cases in the plural). The dative is identical to the nominative in both numbers, although an obsolete dative plural in -aibh is still sometimes encountered in old-fashioned literary style.

When  in the gen. sing. and nom. pl. of a polysyllabic word is made slender, it also becomes voiced, thus:
 >  > .

Some nouns undergo a vowel change before the slender consonant of the genitive singular/nominative plural:
  - an (internal) organ, component part
  - a sole, coin
  - a head
 - a man
 - a fish
  - a son (note: the first consonant is made slender in the gen.sg./nom.pl. as well)
  - a hole

Many words of this declension form the plural with one of the endings -(a)í, -ta, -tha, -anna. These are known as "strong plural" endings, which means the plural is identical in all cases in the standard language. Some examples:
, gen. sg. , pl.  - a fair
, gen. sg. , pl.  - a way
 , gen. sg.  , pl.   - a car
, gen. sg. , pl.  - a voice
, gen. sg. , pl.  - a child
, gen. sg. , pl.  - a cloud
, gen. sg. , pl.  - a rose
, gen. sg. , pl.  - a summer
, gen. sg. , pl.  - a story
, gen. sg. , pl.  - fruit

Some nouns have a weak plural (a plural where the genitive is different from the nominative, and is identical to the form of the nominative singular) in -a:
, gen. sg. , nom. pl. , gen. pl.  - a right
, gen. sg. , nom. pl. , gen. pl.  - a trick
, gen. sg. , nom. pl. , gen. pl.  - an apple

Other strong plural formations are found in:
 - road
 - judge
 - verb
 - skull
 - door
 - professor
 - light

Second
The second declension is made up of mostly feminine nouns, and features a nominative singular form that can end in either a broad or a slender consonant.  The genitive singular ends in a slender consonant followed by -e.  The most common plural form has a broad consonant followed by -a in the nominative, and a broad consonant alone in the genitive. The vocative has the same endings as the nominative, as does the dative in standard language.

In Connacht Irish and Waterford Irish it is often the case that all nouns of the second declension in the nom. sg. end with a slender consonant (e.g.  "a shoe").

In some Munster varieties as well as the old literary language, the dative singular is distinct and ends in a slender consonant alone (in effect the dative sg. is formed by dropping the -e from the genitive sg.), e.g.  "in my shoe" (historically, nominative forms like  are descended from the old dative).

When  in the gen. sing. is made slender, it is also voiced, so  >  > .  becomes , and is written -(a)í.

Many words in this declension form a strong plural with one of the endings -t(h)a,-te, -(e)acha or -eanna:
 "place"
  "forest"
 "daughter"
 "work"
 "sky"
 "country"
  "wave"
 "egg"

Other strong plural formations are found in:
 - tooth
 - shoulder
 - knife (irregular genitive singular)
 (m.) - mountain (irregular genitive singular and masculine gender)

Third
The third declension is made up of masculine and feminine nouns. It is characterized by the genitive singular in -a. The majority of nouns in this class form the plural in -(a)í. The final consonant of the stem may be broad or slender: it retains its quality in the plural, but is always broad in the genitive singular.

Feminine nouns in -áint and -úint lose their t in the gen. sg.; those in -irt have -th- instead of -t- in the gen. sg.
 (f.) "threat"
 (f.) "dialect"

Many words in this declension form the plural with one of the endings -anna or -acha:
 (m.)  "time"
 (m.) "soul"
 (m.)  "back"
 (m.) "lake"
 (f.) "fight, struggle"

Some words in Munster Irish also have a separate dative form:
nom. , dat. , gen. , pl.  (m.)  "back"

Fourth
The fourth declension is made up of masculine and feminine nouns. It is characterized by a genitive singular that is identical in form to the nominative/vocative/dative singular. The singular may end in a vowel or a consonant (usually the diminutive suffix -ín). The most common plural ending is -(a)í.

Many words of this declension form the plural with the following endings -tha/-t(h)e, -((e)a)nna or -((e)a)cha:
 (m.) "animal"
 (m.) "attorney"
 (m.) "village"
 (m.) "bus"
 (m.) "son-in-law"
 (f.) "wound, sore"
 (m.) "nut"
 (m.) "outhouse; eye of a needle"
 (m.) "law"
 (m.) "dozen"
 (m.) "ray, radius"
 (f.) "goose"
 (f.) "shirt"
 (m.) "saying"
 (m.) "king"
  (m.) "last name"
 (f.) "language, tongue"
 (f.) "fire"

Other strong plural formations are found in:
 (m.) "name"
 (m.) "characteristic, symptom"
 (f.) "commandment"
 (m.) "bank (of river etc.)"
 (m.) "race, tribe"
 (m.) "person, human being"
 (m.) "blacksmith"
 (m.) "business"
 (f.) "night"

One noun in this class has a weak plural:
 (f.) - cow

Fifth
The fifth declension is made up mostly of feminine nouns and is characterized by a genitive singular that ends in a broad consonant that has been added to the nominative/vocative/dative singular. The most common plural is strong, formed by adding -a to the genitive singular.

In some Munster Irish varieties as well as the old literary language, the dative singular is distinct and ends in a slender consonant (in effect the dative sg. is formed by palatalizing the genitive sg.), for example,  "to a person",  "from the city". In  "Ireland" the dative  is still used in the standard language.

Some words form the genitive singular by changing the final consonant of the nominative singular to broad. The plural is then strong -eacha.
  "river"
 (m.) "father"
  (m.) "brother"
 "mother"

Other strong plural formations are found in:
 (m.) "brother (monk), friar"
  (m.) "friend"
 (m.) "enemy"
 "Christmas"

Some nouns have weak plurals; here the genitive singular and genitive plural have the same form:
 - sheep
 - duck

Verbal nouns
The most productive verbal nouns end with -(e)adh (1st conjugation) or -(i)ú (2nd conjugation). These originally belonged to the third declension, but synchronically are best regarded as separate declensions.

The 1st conjugation verbal noun in -(e)adh has a genitive singular in -te/-ta and a plural in -t(a)í.
 "breaking"
 "praising; recommendation"

The 2nd conjugation verbal noun in -(i)ú has a genitive singular in -(a)ithe and a plural in -(u)ithe. These endings are pronounced the same regardless of the spelling distinction.
 "examining, examination"
 "stretching"

Irregular nouns
The following nouns are declined irregularly:
 (f.) "woman"
 (f.)  "sister"
  (f.) "drink"
 (m.) "God"
 (m.) "day"
 (f.) "bed"
 (f.) "month"
 (f.) "sea"
 (f.) "wool"
 (m.) "house"

Articles
Their distribution depends on number, case, and gender, and they trigger mutation partly on the basis of the initial sound of the following word. Each entry of the table gives an example of one noun starting with a consonant and one with a vowel.

Dative (i) is used with all prepositions in Ulster usage; in Munster and the standard language it is used only with  "from the",  "to the", and  "in the" but there are also Munster dialects in which only sa(n) triggers lenition and den and don eclipse, as with every other article-preposition compound. In Connacht sa(n) eclipses whereas den and don lenite. Dative (ii) is used outside Ulster with other prepositions.

It does, however, eclipse t and d in Munster dialects and forms like "ag an ndoras" instead of the usual pattern "ag an doras", which is used in all other dialects, do occur.

There is no indefinite article in Irish, so depending on context  can mean "cat" or "a cat".

Adjectives
Almost all adjectives in Irish can be used either predicatively or attributively. A predicative adjective is one that forms a part of the predicate, like red in the sentence The car is red. An attributive adjective directly modifies a noun, as in the red car.

A predicate adjective in Irish does not inflect:

 "That man is small."
 "Those men are small."
 "This woman is small."
 "These women are small."

A predicate adjective expressing a value judgment is often preceded by the particle . This particle attaches a h to a following vowel.

 "I'm fine" (lit. "I am good.")
 "The story is bad."
 "The weather was beautiful."

In Ulster, go is not generally used in these cases.

An attributive adjective mostly follows the noun and is inflected:

 "the small man"
 "of the small man" (genitive)

There are four classes of declension of adjectives in Irish, which correspond to the first four declensions of nouns:

First declension

Second declension

Third declension

Fourth declension
This declension does not inflect, but it does mutate.

Irregular adjectives

Notes
The nominative plural undergoes lenition only if the noun ends with a slender consonant:  "lame cats". Otherwise, the adjective in the nominative plural does not lenite:  "lame tailors".
The long form of the genitive plural (e.g. ,) is used when the noun has a strong plural, e.g.  "of lame mothers". The short form (e.g. ,) is used when the noun has a weak plural, e.g.  "of lame cats".
The dative has the same form as the nominative.
The vocative has the same form as the nominative except in the masculine singular of the 1st/2nd declension, where it has the same form as the genitive.

Comparative
Irish adjectives have a comparative form equivalent to the comparative and superlative in English. The comparative does not undergo inflexion and is the same as the feminine singular genitive in regular and many irregular adjectives.

Regular formation

Irregular forms

Syntax of comparison
There are two constructions to express the comparative:

1) Copula + comparative form + subject +  ("than") + predicate. The preterite of the copula causes lenition, while the present tense does not.

 "Cáit was stronger than Cathal."
 "Seán is bigger than me."
 "The dog was younger than the cat."
 "Broken Irish is better than clever English."

2)  + comparative +  + predicate.  is used if the sentence is in the present or future tense.

, which triggers lenition, is used if the sentence is in the past tense.  is used before words starting with vowels and  before those starting with consonants.

 "The sun is brighter than the moon."
 "Peadar will be richer than his father."
 "Peadar became richer than his father."
 "Seán was bigger than me."

A superlative is expressed as a relative clause: noun +  + comparative form.

 "the strongest girl" (lit. "the girl who is the strongest")
 "the strongest girl" (lit. "the girl who was/would be the strongest")
 "the youngest boy" (lit. "the boy who is the youngest")
 "the youngest boy" (lit. "the boy who was/would be the youngest")

References

Declension
Declension